Real-Time Systems GmbH, headquartered in Ravensburg, Germany, is a privately held software company.

Real-Time Systems develops and sells software products for embedded systems and real-time applications.

Founded in 2006 as a spin-out from industrial robot maker KUKA, Real-Time Systems is providing its solutions globally directly and through distributors and is a member of the  Intel Intelligent Systems Alliance, an Intel Premier Software Partner  and Microsoft Embedded Gold Partner.

Core product lines of the company are the RTS Hypervisor, a real-time capable virtualization solution for Intel Architecture, as well as protocol stacks for the Precision Time Protocol (PTP), IEEE 1588 for time synchronization over packed based networks.

References

External links
 Official website

Software companies of Germany
Software companies established in 2006
German companies established in 2006